Mbolatiana Ramanisa (born May 20, 1982) is a Malagasy former swimmer, who specialized in sprint freestyle events. Ramanisa competed for Madagascar in the women's 50 meter freestyle at the 2000 Summer Olympics in Sydney. She received a ticket from FINA, under a Universality program, in an entry time of 28.54. She challenged seven other swimmers in heat three, including Nigeria's top favorite Ngozi Monu and Aruba's 15-year-old Roshendra Vrolijk. She faded down the stretch with enough quick pace to post a fifth-place time of 29.20, exactly a single second behind leader Monu. Ramanisa failed to advance into the semifinals, as she placed sixty-first overall out of 74 swimmers in the preliminary events.

References

1982 births
Living people
Malagasy female swimmers
Olympic swimmers of Madagascar
Swimmers at the 2000 Summer Olympics
Malagasy female freestyle swimmers
People from Antananarivo